Dubai creek cultural was launched by Ruler of Dubai His Highness Sheikh Mohammed bin Rashid Al Maktoum, the project is a part of Dubai strategic plan 2015.
Upon completion the development will include Dubai Opera House that will be a central feature of the project, 10 museums, 9 libraries, 14 theatres, 7 institutes for arts and culture and 11 art galleries. The development will stretch from Al Shindagha to the creekside of Business Bay.

See also
Dubai Opera House

References
Ismailimail.wordpress.com
Boardreader.com

Proposed buildings and structures in Dubai